National Takaful Company (Watania) PJSC is a takaful company based in Abu Dhabi, United Arab Emirates.

The company was created in 2011 by Abu Dhabi National Islamic Finance, Abu Dhabi National Insurance Company, TAQA and Aldar Properties. These founding investors floated around 55 percent of the company's shares in an initial public offering which was seven times oversubscribed. The company commenced operations shortly after, with the opening of two branches in Abu Dhabi and Dubai over the following two years.

In 2014, Oman-based conglomerate MB Holding acquired a 60.5 percent stake in the company through two subsidiaries, including Al Madina Takaful.

Watania operates using the wakala model and offers general and health takaful products.

References

External links
 

Takaful companies of the United Arab Emirates
Financial services companies established in 2011
Companies based in Abu Dhabi
Companies listed on the Abu Dhabi Securities Exchange
2011 establishments in the United Arab Emirates